The Au Train River is a  river in Au Train Township, Alger County, Michigan. It rises at the outlet of Cleveland Cliffs Basin, a reservoir, and flows north, passing through Au Train Lake, and entering Lake Superior at the village of Au Train.

See also
List of rivers of Michigan

References

Au Train Streamflow Data from the USGS

Rivers of Michigan
Rivers of Alger County, Michigan
Tributaries of Lake Superior

ii
n